Jason Crow (born March 15, 1979) is an American lawyer, veteran, and politician serving as the United States representative for  since 2019. Crow is the first member of the Democratic Party to represent the district, which encompasses several of Denver's eastern suburbs, including Aurora, Littleton, Centennial, and Thornton.

During his first term in Congress, Crow was an impeachment manager for President Donald Trump's first impeachment trial.

Early life and career 
Crow was born in Madison, Wisconsin, in 1979. He earned a Bachelor of Arts degree from the University of Wisconsin–Madison in 2002, and a Juris Doctor from the University of Denver Sturm College of Law in 2009.

Crow is a former Army Ranger. He served three tours of duty in Iraq and Afghanistan as part of the 82nd Airborne Division and 75th Ranger Regiment. Crow took part in the Battle of Samawah in 2003 as a platoon leader in the 82nd Airborne Division; for his actions during the battle, he was awarded the Bronze Star. Crow served on the Colorado Board of Veterans Affairs from 2009 to 2014. After service, Crow became partner with the Holland and Hart Law Firm. In 2015, he received the University of Denver's Ammi Hyde Award for Recent Graduate Achievement.

U.S. House of Representatives

Elections

2018 

On April 17, 2017, Crow announced his intention to run against four-term Republican incumbent Mike Coffman to represent Colorado's 6th congressional district in the United States House of Representatives.

In the Democratic primary, Crow defeated progressive businessman Levi Tillemann with nearly two-thirds of the vote. He defeated Coffman in the November 6 general election with 54% of the vote, winning two of the district's three counties. He is the first Democrat to represent the district since its creation in 1982.

2020 

Crow ran for election to a second term, and faced no opposition in the Democratic primary. He defeated Steve House, former chairman of the Colorado Republican Party, in the November 3 general election by over 17% of the vote, winning all three counties.

Tenure 
Crow described his experience during the storming of the Capitol: "I got into Ranger mode a little bit. Most of the members didn’t know how to use the emergency masks, so I was helping them get their emergency masks out of the bags and helped instruct a bunch of folks on how to put it on and how to use it." He also locked doors in the chamber, moved other lawmakers away from the doors, and directed them to "remove their pins so they weren’t identifiable in case the mob did break through".  Crow held distressed Representative Susan Wild's hand, as captured in a photo that went viral. He said, "I certainly haven’t felt that way since I was in combat in Iraq and Afghanistan. I never in a million years would have thought I would have been experiencing that as a member of Congress in the U.S. Capitol."

Committee assignments 
 Permanent Select Committee on Intelligence
 Subcommittee on Defense Intelligence and Warfighter Support
 Subcommittee on Intelligence Modernization & Readiness
 Committee on Armed Services
 Subcommittee on Cyber, Innovative Technologies, and Information Systems
 Subcommittee on Readiness
 Committee on Small Business
 Subcommittee on Innovation, Entrepreneurship, and Workforce Development (Chair)

Caucus memberships 
New Democrat Coalition
For Country Caucus

Political positions

Abortion 
Crow supports abortion rights. "I will always fight to protect a woman's right to choose. Women should have the right to make healthcare decisions that are right for them and their families. I have fought to protect a woman's right to choose, while simultaneously working to continue funding critical resources like Planned Parenthood."

Foreign policy 
During the Russo-Ukrainian War, Crow signed a letter advocating for President Biden to give F-16 fighter jets to Ukraine.

Gun control 

Crow voiced support for gun control reform while campaigning for the House of Representatives. On February 28, 2019, he voted for the Bipartisan Background Checks Act (H.R.8) after cosponsoring the bill. H.R.8, if passed, will require unlicensed gun sellers to conduct background checks on gun buyers. Crow is also a cosponsor of the Assault Weapon Ban Act (H.R.1296), which would limit access to guns that are considered assault weapons. After the Colorado Springs nightclub shooting, Crow said, "...citizenship comes with privilege, but it also comes with duties and responsibilities. We have duties to each other, and responsible firearm ownership and protecting our communities and our children is one of those duties that, frankly, we are failing at right now.”

Impeachment 
On September 23, 2019, Crow was one of seven freshman lawmakers with national security backgrounds who shared an opinion essay in The Washington Post voicing their support for an impeachment inquiry against Donald Trump. In interviews, Crow said it was important that "the inquiry stay focused and proceed efficiently". On January 15, 2020, Crow was selected as one of seven impeachment managers who presented the impeachment case against Trump during his trial before the United States Senate.

LGBT rights 
Crow supports same-sex marriage and the expansion of LGBT non-discrimination laws. He supported President Barack Obama's repeal of Don't ask, don't tell at the 2012 Democratic National Convention. He opposed President Trump's transgender military ban, cosponsoring an amendment to the 2020 National Defense Authorization Act to overturn the ban. In 2021, he supported the Equality Act.

Special interests 
Crow refused corporate PAC money during his campaign. He is a sponsor of the For the People Act of 2019, which would end gerrymandering and create automatic voter registration. The bill would also prevent members of Congress from serving on corporate boards. It also seeks to eliminate dark money contributions.

Electoral history

Personal life
Crow and his wife Deserai (née Anderson) have two children.

References

External links

 Congressman Jason Crow official U.S. House website
 Jason Crow for Congress campaign website

|-

United States Army personnel of the Iraq War
United States Army personnel of the War in Afghanistan (2001–2021)
Colorado lawyers
Living people
Democratic Party members of the United States House of Representatives from Colorado
Military personnel from Colorado
Sturm College of Law alumni
United States Army Rangers
United States Army officers
University of Wisconsin–Madison alumni
1979 births